

Crown
Head of State - Queen Elizabeth II

Federal government
Governor General - Jeanne Sauvé

Cabinet
Prime Minister -  Brian Mulroney
Deputy Prime Minister - Erik Nielsen then Don Mazankowski
Minister of Finance - Michael Wilson
Secretary of State for External Affairs - Joe Clark
Secretary of State for Canada - Benoît Bouchard then David Crombie
Minister of National Defence - Erik Nielsen then Perrin Beatty
Minister of National Health and Welfare - Jake Epp
Minister of Regional Industrial Expansion - Sinclair Stevens then Don Mazankowski (acting) then Michel Côté
Minister of the Environment - Thomas McMillan
Minister of Justice - John Crosbie then Ray Hnatyshyn
Minister of Transport - Don Mazankowski then John Crosbie
Minister of Communications - Marcel Masse then Flora MacDonald
Minister of Fisheries and Oceans - Tom Siddon
Minister of Agriculture - John Wise
Minister of Public Works - Roch LaSalle then Stewart McInnes
Minister of Employment and Immigration - Flora MacDonald then Benoît Bouchard
Minister of Indian Affairs and Northern Development - David Crombie then Bill McKnight
Minister of Energy, Mines and Resources - Pat Carney then Marcel Masse
Minister of State (Forestry) - Gerald Merrithew

Parliament
See: 33rd Canadian parliament

Party leaders
Progressive Conservative Party of Canada -  Brian Mulroney
Liberal Party of Canada - John Turner
New Democratic Party- Ed Broadbent

Supreme Court Justices
Chief Justice: Brian Dickson
William McIntyre
Bertha Wilson
Antonio Lamer
Gérard V. La Forest
John Sopinka
Jean Beetz
Julien Chouinard
Gerald Eric Le Dain

Other
Speaker of the House of Commons - John William Bosley then John Allen Fraser
Governor of the Bank of Canada - Gerald Bouey
Chief of the Defence Staff - General G.C.E. Thériault then General P.D. Manson

Provinces

Premiers
Premier of Alberta - Don Getty
Premier of British Columbia - Bill Bennett then Bill Vander Zalm
Premier of Manitoba - Howard Pawley
Premier of New Brunswick - Richard Hatfield
Premier of Newfoundland - Brian Peckford
Premier of Nova Scotia - John Buchanan
Premier of Ontario - David Peterson
Premier of Prince Edward Island - James Lee then Joe Ghiz
Premier of Quebec - Robert Bourassa
Premier of Saskatchewan - Grant Devine

Lieutenant-governors
Lieutenant-Governor of Alberta - Helen Hunley
Lieutenant-Governor of British Columbia - Robert Gordon Rogers
Lieutenant-Governor of Manitoba - Pearl McGonigal then George Johnson
Lieutenant-Governor of New Brunswick - George F.G. Stanley
Lieutenant-Governor of Newfoundland and Labrador - William Anthony Paddon then James Aloysius McGrath
Lieutenant-Governor of Nova Scotia -Alan Abraham
Lieutenant-Governor of Ontario - Lincoln Alexander
Lieutenant-Governor of Prince Edward Island - Robert Lloyd George MacPhail
Lieutenant-Governor of Quebec - Gilles Lamontagne
Lieutenant-Governor of Saskatchewan - Sylvia Fedoruk

Mayors
Toronto - Art Eggleton
Montreal - Jean Drapeau then Jean Doré
Vancouver - Michael Harcourt then Gordon Campbell
Ottawa - James A. Durrell

Religious leaders
Roman Catholic Bishop of Quebec - Cardinal Archbishop Louis-Albert Vachon
Roman Catholic Bishop of Montreal -  Cardinal Archbishop Paul Grégoire
Roman Catholic Bishops of London - Bishop John Michael Sherlock
Moderator of the United Church of Canada - Robert F. Smith then Anne M. Squire

See also
1985 Canadian incumbents
Events in Canada in 1986
1987 Canadian incumbents
Governmental leaders in 1986
Canadian incumbents by year

1986
Incumbents
Canadian leaders